Robert J. Shaw (1917 in Pewaukee, Wisconsin – 1996) was an American television writer with 39 credits and teacher of screenwriting at UCLA.

Career
Shaw attended the University of Wisconsin. In 1940 he sold Front Page Farrell to NBC. He subsequently went on to work on Mr. District Attorney, The Million Dollar Face, Hawaiian Eye, Medical Center, The F.B.I., and Portia Faces Life. With Robert Montgomery Presents, Shaw launched his television writing career. He worked on Hawaiian Eye, Peyton Place, Dallas ("The Gathering Storm"), 77 Sunset Strip, Search for Tomorrow, Somerset, CBS Daytime 90 (1974: starring Constance Towers, Brett Halsey and Tom Happer) and General Hospital (ex-head writer). Shaw died on March 30, 1996 in Los Angeles

Recognition
Shaw earned seven Emmy Awards nominations during his career.

Filmography

Films

Television

References

External links

1917 births
1996 deaths
American soap opera writers
People from Pewaukee, Wisconsin
Screenwriters from California
Screenwriters from Wisconsin
20th-century American screenwriters
University of Wisconsin–Madison alumni
University of California, Los Angeles faculty